Pichari is a town in central Peru, capital of the Pichari District, La Convención Province, Cusco Region. It is located on the east side of the Apurímac River, only about 3 km from the town of Sivia, capital of the Sivia District in Huanta Province, Ayacucho Region, on the other side of the river.

References

Populated places in the Cusco Region